Fatwa prohibiting the insulting of the most religious figures of Sunni Islam was published by Iran's Supreme Leader, Ali Khamenei, on 30 September 2010. The fatwa was issued following the insulting of Aisha by Yasser Al-Habib. This fatwa received various reactions from Shia and Sunni Muslims, and from Arabic and Western media.

The fatwa is binding only upon those performing taqlid to Ayatollah Khamenei. Twelver Shias following numerous other maraji that maybe disagree with the ruling, are not obliged to respect it and may even act against it. Mohammad-Taqi Bahjat, Ali al-Sistani, Naser Makarem Shirazi, Abdul-Karim Mousavi Ardebili, Mousa Shubairi Zanjanihave similar opinion to Khamenei in this issue.

Background
In August 2010,  Al-Habib, a London-based Kuwaiti cleric, celebrated the anniversary of the death of Aisha in Hussainiya and said celebrating her death is necessary for Islamic victory. The report of the celebration was published on his website and aired on Fadak Satellite Channel. The online publication of Al-Habib's speech about Aisha, especially a video posted on YouTube, provoked anger among Sunni Muslims, who view Aisha as one of the most revered religious figures, and led to protests and reactions in the Muslim countries. On 20 September 2010, the Kuwaiti government held a meeting and accused Al-Habib of insulting religious symbols and attempting to excite sedition in Kuwait, and cancelled his citizenship. In Saudi Arabia and Bahrain, a number of Shia clerics condemned his actions and they considered it as his abandonment from Shia beliefs.

Fatwa
Several Saudi Arabian Shia clerics asked Khamenei to express his view on the incident to stem sectarian tensions in the Persian Gulf region. Khamenei said:

Disrespecting the pure wives of the Muhammad prophet should be avoided. The Prophet's wives are all respectable; anyone who insults any of them has insulted the Prophet Muhammad. I resolutely declare this offensive. The commander of the Faithful, Ali treated her eminence Aisha in such a respectful manner. He treated a woman, who had come to fight against him, with the utmost respect because she was the Muhammad Prophet's wife; otherwise the Commander of the Faithful would not stand on a ceremony with anyone: hence, no such disrespect should ever occur.

Reaction
News agency Reuters described the fatwa issued by  Ayatollah Ali Khamenei as receiving "widespread praise".

Domestic
Iranian parliamentarian Ali Motahari said Khamenei's stress on Islamic unity in the fatwa indicates his accurate assessment of the situation. According to Sunni clerics of Golestan Province, Khamenei showed his knowledge and prevented the sedition of enemies.

Foreign
This fatwa received various reactions in Arabic media, including daily newspapers Al-Anba and AlRay AlAam in Kuwait, As-Safir in Lebanon, Al Watan and Okaz in Saudi Arabia, Al-Hayat in London, the daily newspaper Al-Shorouk and radio and television broadcasters in Egypt, and some Arabic satellite television channels. Al Jazeera reviewed the fatwa and its effect on the Islamic unity, repeating it in several news broadcasts. Sheikh Ahmed el-Tayeb, the most prominent Sunni scholar in Cairo, praised the fatwa in an interview on Al Jazeera. He said the fatwa had been published at the right time and could help to control sectarian tensions. Hassan Nasrallah, secretary-general of Hezbollah of Lebanon, said during a meeting with the leader of the Nahdlatul Ulama in Indonesia Said Aqil Siradj, said the fatwa disappointed those who tried to harm Islamic unity. Many authorities supported the fatwa, including the secretary general of the Lebanese Ummah Movement, Abdul Nasser Al-Jabri; the leader of the Muslim Brotherhood in Jordan, Hammam Saeed; Maulana Syed Jalaluddin Umri; Sheikh Maher Mezher, the head of the Sunni society to support the resistance in Lebanon; secretary general of the Jordanian Islamic Action Front (IAF), Hamza Mansour; and the Lebanese Islamic Action Front.

Abdel Moaty Bayoumi, professor of theology and philosophy at Cairo's Al-Azhar University, said the fatwa was incomplete because it focused only on Aisha. Mohamed Megahed al-Zayat, vice-director of the National Center for Middle East Studies, criticized the Iranian media for not paying much attention to the fatwa. He said it targets Arabs and could not affect Sunni Arab people, pointing to the political background of the fatwa.

See also

 List of current Maraji
 A 250 Years Old Person (Seyyed Ali Khamenei's book, his lectures's collection on the political combats/struggles of Shia Imams)
 To the Youth in Europe and North America
 Khamenei's fatwa against nuclear weapons
 Palestine

References

Ali Khamenei
Fatwas
2010 in Iran
Shia–Sunni relations
September 2010 events in Iran